The Alliance of Liberals and Democrats for Europe Party (ALDE Party) is a European political party composed of 60 national-level parties from across Europe, mainly active in the European Union. The ALDE Party is affiliated with the Liberal International and a recognised European political party, incorporated as a non-profit association under Belgian law.

It was founded on 26 March 1976 in Stuttgart as a confederation of national political parties under the name "Federation of Liberal and Democrat Parties in Europe" and renamed "European Liberals and Democrats" (ELD) in 1977 and "European Liberal Democrats and Reformists" (ELDR) in 1986. On 30 April 2004, the ELDR was reformed as an official European party, the "European Liberal Democrat and Reform Party" (ELDR Party).

On 10 November 2012, the party chose its current name of ALDE Party, taken from its then-European Parliament group, the Alliance of Liberals and Democrats for Europe (ALDE), which had been formed on 20 July 2004 in conjunction with the European Democratic Party (EDP). Prior to the 2004 European election the European party had been represented through its own group, the European Liberal Democrat and Reform Party Group (ELDR) Group. In June 2019, the ALDE group was succeeded by Renew Europe.

, ALDE is represented in European Union institutions, with 70 MEPs and five members of the European Commission. Of the 27 EU member states, there are five with ALDE-affiliated Prime Ministers: Mark Rutte (VVD) in the Netherlands, Xavier Bettel (DP) in Luxembourg, Kaja Kallas (Estonian Reform Party) in Estonia, Alexander De Croo (Open VLD) in Belgium and Micheál Martin (FF) in Ireland. ALDE member parties are also in governments in six other EU member states: Croatia, Finland, Latvia, Slovenia, Lithuania and Germany. Some other ALDE member parties offer parliamentary support to governments in Croatia, Denmark, Italy, Romania and Sweden. Charles Michel, former Belgian Prime Minister, is current President of the European Council.

ALDE's think tank is the European Liberal Forum, led by Hilde Vautmans, MEP, and gathers 46 member organisations. The youth wing of ALDE is the European Liberal Youth (LYMEC), which is predominantly based upon youth and student liberal organisations but contains also a small number of individual members. LYMEC is led by Dan-Aria Sucuri.

In 2011, the ALDE Party became the first pan-European party to create the status of individual membership. Since then, between 1000 and close to 3000 members (the numbers fluctuate annually) maintain direct membership in the ALDE Party from several EU countries. Over 40 coordinators mobilise liberal ideas, initiatives and expertise across the continent under the leadership of the Steering Committee, which was first chaired by Julie Cantalou. The ALDE Party took a step further in the direction of becoming a truly pan-European party when granting voting rights to individual members’ delegates at the Party Congress.

Structure

Bureau 
The day-to-day management of the ALDE Party is handled by the Bureau, the members of which are:

Presidents 
 1978–1981:  Gaston Thorn
 1981–1985:  Willy De Clercq
 1985–1990:  Colette Flesch
 1990–1995:  Willy De Clercq
 1995–2000:  Uffe Ellemann-Jensen
 2000–2005:  Werner Hoyer
 2005–2011:  Annemie Neyts-Uyttebroeck
 2011–2015:  Graham Watson
 2015–2021:  Hans van Baalen
 2021–2022: acting co-Presidents  Timmy Dooley   Ilhan Kyuchyuk

History of pan-European liberalism 

Pan-European liberalism has a long history dating back to the foundation of Liberal International in April 1947. On 26 March 1976, the Federation of Liberal and Democrat Parties in Europe was established in Stuttgart. The founding parties of the federation were the Free Democratic Party of Germany, Radical Party of France, Venstre of Denmark, Italian Liberal Party, Dutch People's Party for Freedom and Democracy and Democratic Party of Luxembourg. Observer members joining later in 1976 were the Danish Social Liberal Party, French Radical Party of the Left and Independent Republicans, British Liberal Party, and Italian Republican Party. In 1977, the federation was renamed European Liberals and Democrats, in 1986, European Liberal Democrats and Reformists.

It evolved into the European Liberal Democrat and Reform Party (ELDR Party) in 2004, when it was founded as an official European party under that name and incorporated under Belgian law at an extraordinary Congress in Brussels, held on 30 April 2004 the day before the enlargement of the European Union. At the same time the matching group in the European Parliament, the European Liberal Democrats and Reformists Group allied with the members of the newly elected European Democratic Party, forming the Alliance of Liberals and Democrats for Europe (ALDE) with a matching ALDE Group in the European Parliament.

On 10 November 2012, the ELDR Party adopted the name of the alliance between the two parties, to match the parliamentary group and the alliance.

On 12 June 2019, the ALDE group was succeeded by a new enlarged group, Renew Europe, which primarily consists of ALDE and EDP member parties and France's La République En Marche! (LREM).

European Council

European Commissioners 
ALDE Member Parties contribute four out of the 28 members of the European Commission:

Elected representatives of member parties

European institutions

National parliaments of European Union member states

National parliaments outside the European Union

Member parties

Outside the EU

See also 
 European Liberal Forum
 European Liberal Youth
 Liberal International
 Political parties of the world

References

External links 

 
 European Liberal Youth (LYMEC)

 
Alliance of Liberals and Democrats for Europe
Liberal International